Henderson Constituency was a constituency in Singapore. It used to exist from 1972 to 1988, and it was merged into Tiong Bahru Group Representation Constituency. It carved out of Tiong Bahru Constituency.

Member of Parliament

Elections

Elections in the 1970s

References 

Singaporean electoral divisions
Tiong Bahru